The Second Battle of Guangzhou was fought between the rival armies of the Liangguang region in Southern China as part of the internal conflicts within the Kuomintang leading up to the Central Plains War. The previous month, the New Guangxi clique had fought the Sichuan clique at the Battle of Yichang in Hubei. The forces of the New Guangxi clique attacked Guangzhou from both their home province of Guangxi as well as Jiangxi. Guangdong forces captured a brigade commander of the New Guangxi clique's army.

Bibliography
中華民國國防大學編，《中國現代軍事史主要戰役表》

Conflicts in 1929
Conflicts in Guangdong
Conflicts in Guangzhou